Alex Papps (born 11 February 1969) is an Australian actor, television host, writer and singer.

Early life
Papps, was born in 1969, to Apollo Papps, a Greek father born in Cairo and a mother of half English half-Jewish descent, both his parents where teachers, who became amateur theatre directors. He attended Belgrave Kindergarten Upwey South Primary School and Tecoma Primary, and Upwey High School. Papps performed in a number of theatre productions prior to leaving school.

Career
After appearing in TV serial Neighbours as Greg Davis, he became better known for his role in Home and Away as original Frank Morgan. Previously he featured in The Henderson Kids as Vince Cerontonia. He was also a host of music program The Factory.

Since 2005 he has been a presenter on the ABC's children's show Play School, alongside his former Home and Away co-star Justine Clarke who played his girlfriend Roo Stewart, with whom he also appears in the ABC drama The Time of our Lives. He has released an album of children's songs.

In 1988 he won the Logie Award for Most Popular New Talent, and later graduated from the Western Australian Academy of Performing Arts. In 2018, he returned to Summer Bay, alongside co-star Nicolle Dickson, who played his foster sister and later wife to celebrate the Home and Away 30th anniversary commemoration.

Filmography

References

External links

Interview with Alex Papps

1969 births
Australian male television actors
Australian people of Greek descent
Australian children's television presenters
Living people
Logie Award winners
Male actors from Melbourne